The rock cycle  is a basic concept in geology that describes transitions through geologic time among the three main rock types: sedimentary, metamorphic, and igneous. Each rock type is altered when it is forced out of its equilibrium conditions. For example, an igneous rock such as basalt may break down and dissolve when exposed to the atmosphere, or melt as it is subducted under a continent. Due to the driving forces of the rock cycle, plate tectonics and the water cycle, rocks do not remain in equilibrium and change as they encounter new environments. The rock cycle explains how the three rock types are related to each other, and how processes change from one type to another over time. This cyclical aspect makes rock change a geologic cycle and, on planets containing life, a biogeochemical cycle.

The rock cycle

Transition to igneous rock
When rocks are pushed deep under the Earth's surface, they may melt into magma. If the conditions no longer exist for the magma to stay in its liquid state, it cools and solidifies into an igneous rock. A rock that cools within the Earth is called intrusive or plutonic and cools very slowly, producing a coarse-grained texture such as the rock granite. As a result of volcanic activity, magma (which is called lava when it reaches Earth's surface) may cool very rapidly on the Earth's surface exposed to the atmosphere and are called extrusive or volcanic rocks. These rocks are fine-grained and sometimes cool so rapidly that no crystals can form and result in a natural glass, such as obsidian, however the most common fine-grained rock would be known as basalt. Any of the three main types of rocks (igneous, sedimentary, and metamorphic rocks) can melt into magma and cool into igneous rocks.

Secondary changes
Epigenetic change (secondary processes occurring at low temperatures and low pressures) may be arranged under a number of headings, each of which is typical of a group of rocks or rock-forming minerals, though usually more than one of these alterations is in progress in the same rock. Silicification, the replacement of the minerals by crystalline or crypto-crystalline silica, is most common in felsic rocks, such as rhyolite, but is also found in serpentine, etc. Kaolinization is the decomposition of the feldspars, which are the most common minerals in igneous rocks, into kaolin (along with quartz and other clay minerals); it is best shown by granites and syenites. Serpentinization is the alteration of olivine to serpentine (with magnetite); it is typical of peridotites, but occurs in most of the mafic rocks. In uralitization, secondary hornblende replaces augite; chloritization is the alteration of augite (biotite or hornblende) to chlorite, and is seen in many diabases, diorites and greenstones. Epidotization occurs also in rocks of this group, and consists in the development of epidote from biotite, hornblende, augite or plagioclase feldspar.

Transition to metamorphic rock
Rocks exposed to high temperatures and pressures can be changed physically or chemically to form a different rock, called metamorphic. Regional metamorphism refers to the effects on large masses of rocks over a wide area, typically associated with mountain building events within orogenic belts. These rocks commonly exhibit distinct bands of differing mineralogy and colors, called foliation. Another main type of metamorphism is caused when a body of rock comes into contact with an igneous intrusion that heats up this surrounding country rock. This contact metamorphism results in a rock that is altered and re-crystallized by the extreme heat of the magma and/or by the addition of fluids from the magma that add chemicals to the surrounding rock (metasomatism). Any pre-existing type of rock can be modified by the processes of metamorphism.

Transition to sedimentary rock
Rocks exposed to the atmosphere are variably unstable and subject to the processes of weathering and erosion. Weathering and erosion break the original rock down into smaller fragments and carry away dissolved material. This fragmented material accumulates and is buried by additional material. While an individual grain of sand is still a member of the class of rock it was formed from, a rock made up of such grains fused together is sedimentary. Sedimentary rocks can be formed from the lithification of these buried smaller fragments (clastic sedimentary rock), the accumulation and lithification of material generated by living organisms (biogenic sedimentary rock - fossils), or lithification of chemically precipitated material from a mineral bearing solution due to evaporation (precipitate sedimentary rock). Clastic rocks can be formed from fragments broken apart from larger rocks of any type, due to processes such as erosion or from organic material, like plant remains. Biogenic and precipitate rocks form from the deposition of minerals from chemicals dissolved from all other rock types.

Forces that drive the rock cycle

Plate tectonics

In 1967, J. Tuzo Wilson published an article in Nature describing the repeated opening and closing of ocean basins, in particular focusing on the current Atlantic Ocean area. This concept, a part of the plate tectonics revolution, became known as the Wilson cycle. The Wilson cycle has had profound effects on the modern interpretation of the rock cycle as plate tectonics became recognized as the driving force for the rock cycle.

Spreading ridges
At the mid-ocean divergent boundaries new magma is produced by mantle upwelling and a shallow melting zone. This juvenile basaltic magma is an early phase of the igneous portion of the cycle. As the tectonic plates on either side of the ridge move apart the new rock is carried away from the ridge, the interaction of heated circulating seawater through fractures starts the retrograde metamorphism of the new rock.

Subduction zones

The new basaltic oceanic crust eventually meets a subduction zone as it moves away from the spreading ridge. As this crust is pulled back into the mantle, the increasing pressure and temperature conditions cause a restructuring of the mineralogy of the rock, this metamorphism alters the rock to form eclogite. As the slab of basaltic crust and some included sediments are dragged deeper, water and other more volatile materials are driven off and rise into the overlying wedge of rock above the subduction zone, which is at a lower pressure. The lower pressure, high temperature, and now volatile rich material in this wedge melts and the resulting buoyant magma rises through the overlying rock to produce island arc or continental margin volcanism. This volcanism includes more silicic lavas the further from the edge of the island arc or continental margin, indicating a deeper source and a more differentiated magma.

At times some of the metamorphosed downgoing slab may be thrust up or obducted onto the continental margin. These blocks of mantle peridotite and the metamorphic eclogites are exposed as ophiolite complexes.

The newly erupted volcanic material is subject to rapid erosion depending on the climate conditions. These sediments accumulate within the basins on either side of an island arc. As the sediments become more deeply buried lithification begins and sedimentary rock results.

Continental collision
On the closing phase of the classic Wilson cycle, two continental or smaller terranes meet at a convergent zone. As the two masses of continental crust meet, neither can be subducted as they are both low density silicic rock. As the two masses meet, tremendous compressional forces distort and modify the rocks involved. The result is regional metamorphism within the interior of the ensuing orogeny or mountain building event. As the two masses are compressed, folded and faulted into a mountain range by the continental collision the whole suite of pre-existing igneous, volcanic, sedimentary and earlier metamorphic rock units are subjected to this new metamorphic event.

Accelerated erosion
The high mountain ranges produced by continental collisions are immediately subjected to the forces of erosion. Erosion wears down the mountains and massive piles of sediment are developed in adjacent ocean margins, shallow seas, and as continental deposits. As these sediment piles are buried deeper they become lithified into sedimentary rock. The metamorphic, igneous, and sedimentary rocks of the mountains become the new piles of sediments in the adjoining basins and eventually become sedimentary rock.

An evolving process
The plate tectonics rock cycle is an evolutionary process. Magma generation, both in the spreading ridge environment and within the wedge above a subduction zone, favors the eruption of the more silicic and volatile rich fraction of the crustal or upper mantle material. This lower density material tends to stay within the crust and not be subducted back into the mantle. The magmatic aspects of plate tectonics tends to gradual segregation within or between the mantle and crust. As magma forms, the initial melt is composed of the more silicic phases that have a lower melting point. This leads to partial melting and further segregation of the lithosphere. In addition the silicic continental crust is relatively buoyant and is not normally subducted back into the mantle. So over time the continental masses grow larger and larger.

The role of water

The presence of abundant water on Earth is of great importance for the rock cycle. Most obvious perhaps are the water driven processes of weathering and erosion. Water in the form of precipitation and acidic soil water and groundwater is quite effective at dissolving minerals and rocks, especially those igneous and metamorphic rocks and marine sedimentary rocks that are unstable under near surface and atmospheric conditions. The water carries away the ions dissolved in solution and the broken-down fragments that are the products of weathering. Running water carries vast amounts of sediment in rivers back to the ocean and inland basins. The accumulated and buried sediments are converted back into rock.

A less obvious role of water is in the metamorphism processes that occur in fresh seafloor volcanic rocks as seawater, sometimes heated, flows through the fractures and crevices in the rock. All of these processes, illustrated by serpentinization, are an important part of the destruction of volcanic rock.

The role of water and other volatiles in the melting of existing crustal rock in the wedge above a subduction zone is a most important part of the cycle. Along with water, the presence of carbon dioxide and other carbon compounds from abundant marine limestone within the sediments atop the down going slab is another source of melt inducing volatiles. This involves the carbon cycle as a part of the overall rock cycle.

See also

References

Fichter, Lynn S., (2000), The Wilson Cycle and a Plate Tectonic Rock Cycle, James Madison University, Department of Geology and Environmental Science. Retrieved 18 Aug. 2005.

External links
The Six Fundamental Concepts about the Earth's Geology - NASA
Wilson cycle - a detailed Plate Tectonics rock cycle
Modelling the rock cycle with STELLA
Wilson cycle
A circular Wilson cycle?

Biogeochemical cycle
Geological processes
Petrology